The Falcon Inn is a public house located at the junction of Queen Street and Falcon Street in Ipswich Suffolk. Located at 1 Falcon street it was owned by the Falcon Brewery located next door at 5 Falcon Street.

References to the Falcon go back to August 1728 when the Ipswich Journal announced a shooting competition at "the sign of the Falcon" in St Nicholas Parish, Ipswich. During the eighteenth century, John Curtis has been identified as running the pub, moving there from the Cock and Pye, Ipswich in 1743. He died the next year and John Osborn took over.

From at least 1816 it was owned by a succession of three people called Robert Bowman. By 1855 by Alfred Bowman was in charge, and he sold the business by auction in that year. By 1865 it was owned by Bridges and Cuthbert, who established a company that also acquired the Cross Keys Brewery, Culver St, Colchester, but went bankrupt in 1868. It passed into the hands of the Norfolk & Suffolk Brewery Co Ltd in 1886, which was then renamed the Colchester Brewing Company the next year, at which time the Falcon Brewery was closed. 

The pub then started selling Ind Coope products and was run by the pubs group Punch.

In 2010 the Falcon Inn became known as "Bowmans Bar and Lounge". However, this closed due to bankruptcy in 2017. The pub reopened in 2018, once again as the Falcon.

The pub had an attached music hall where the Ipswich Industrial Co-operative Society was founded on 3 March 1868.

References

Pubs in Ipswich